Annestown is a coastal village in County Waterford, Ireland on the Copper Coast between Dungarvan and Tramore made up of around 25 cottages and houses built on a steep hill.

Sports
It is a destination for surfers but only when there are large swells and waves as the cove has very shallow water. The town is also home to Seaview Celtic F.C. which is a small youth football club.

See also
 List of towns and villages in Ireland

References

External links

 Copper Coast Website
 Copper Coast Geopark - Annestown Walking Trail Card

Towns and villages in County Waterford